In African music, the calabash is a percussion instrument of the family of idiophones consisting of a half of a large calabash, which is struck with the palms, fingers, wrist or objects to produce a variety of percussive sounds.

In Tuareg music, the askalabo is a calabash "partly submerged in water, drummed to mimic camels' hooves".

The calabash can also be used as a sound board: a finger piano (a flat board with a bridge on which prongs are fastened, that are then played with the fingers) can use a calabash for that purpose, and the gongoma is a similar instrument, using saw blades on a bridge affixed over the calabash—the blades are plucked with the fingers, while the player taps the calabash with their other hand.

References

External links
Video with calabash players

Idiophones
African musical instruments